Adolphe Robert (17 January 1833, Melun – 23 December 1899, Paris) was a 19th-century French historian and biographer.

With , he wrote the Dictionnaire des parlementaires français (1789-1889) (Paris, 1889–1891, 5 vol.) and collaborated to the Dictionnaire historique et biographique de la Révolution et de l'Empire by Jean-François Robinet (Paris, Librairie historique de la Révolution et de l'Empire, 1898, 2 vol.).

External links 
 Adolphe Robert on data.bnf.fr
 Dictionnaire des parlementaires français... : depuis le 1er mai 1789

1833 births
1899 deaths
19th-century French historians
French biographers
People from Melun